Titus Julius Priscus was a mid-3rd-century Roman usurper.

He was the governor of Thrace, and proclaimed himself Emperor in opposition to Emperor Decius at Philippopolis towards the end of 251, probably with Gothic collusion following their successful siege at the Battle of Philippopolis. The Roman Senate declared him a public enemy almost as soon as he attempted to usurp the throne. Priscus was killed shortly after his proclamation.

References

External links
 Mention in Decius page on roman-emperors.org

3rd-century Roman emperors
3rd-century Roman usurpers
Roman governors of Thracia